XHIP-FM/XEIP-AM is a combo radio station on 89.7 FM and 1050 AM in Uruapan, Michoacán. It is owned by Radiorama and carries its La Poderosa grupera format.

History
XEIP-AM 750 received its concession on August 3, 1994, owned by Radiorama subsidiary Voz y Música, S.A. Just months later, on November 4, it became an AM-FM combo. The AM station later moved to 1050.

References

Radio stations in Michoacán